Zulfiqar Butt (born 1 January 1971) is a Pakistani former cricketer. He played 42 first-class matches in Pakistan between 1984 and 1998. He was also part of Pakistan's squad for the 1988 Youth Cricket World Cup.

References

External links
 

1971 births
Living people
Pakistani cricketers
Gujranwala cricketers
House Building Finance Corporation cricketers
Cricketers from Lahore